Wang Bo (born 8 May 1982) is a Chinese association football player who currently plays for Nei Mongol Zhongyou in the China League One.

Club career
Wang started his career with Shenyang Ginde in the 2001 league season where he gained regular playing time in his debut season making 17 appearances and scoring one goal, however he struggled to hold down a permanent position the following seasons. This led to him being transferred to second tier club Xiamen Lanshi in 2005 where he gained more playing time and aided the team to a division title and promotion to the top tier in his debut season. He remained with Xiamen Lanshi for several further seasons until the club were relegated from the top flight and disbanded at the end of 2007 league season. Wang would move to Changchun Yatai for a season before he was loaned out to Henan Construction for a season long loan during 2009.

On 28 January 2016, Wang transferred to China League One club Nei Mongol Zhongyou.

Career statistics 
Statistics accurate as of match played 31 December 2019.

Honours
Xiamen Lanshi
China League One: 2005

References

External links
Profile at data.sports.163.com
Profile at sodasoccer.com
 

1982 births
Living people
Footballers from Shenyang
Chinese footballers
Changsha Ginde players
Xiamen Blue Lions players
Changchun Yatai F.C. players
Henan Songshan Longmen F.C. players
Liaoning F.C. players
Inner Mongolia Zhongyou F.C. players
Chinese Super League players
China League One players
Association football defenders
21st-century Chinese people